The Coton de Tuléar is a breed of small dog named for the city of Tuléar (also known as Toliara) in Madagascar. This breed is thought to have originated from a group of small white dogs that swam across the Malagasy channel following a shipwreck. The Coton de Tuléar Day is celebrated on November 26th.

Description

Appearance
Multiple registries with differing standards describe the Coton de Tuléar, but it generally has very soft voluptuous hair (as opposed to fur), comparable to a cotton ball (hence its name in French, coton meaning cotton), a prominent black nose, large expressive eyes (usually covered by bangs), and somewhat short legs. The Coton de Tuléar's tail should curl over its back.

Coat and color

The Coton de Tuléar has a medium-to-long, fluffy, cotton-like coat that is considered hair rather than fur. It is a non-shedding breed with low dander and is considered hypoallergenic. When it is a puppy, it may shed its puppy coat. Like the poodles, Maltese or the Havanese, this breed has very low allergic effects. Matted hair is common for this breed and should be removed through daily brushing and combing. Grooming the Coton de Tuléar can be quite a challenge.

The Coton de Tuléar comes in three accepted colors: white (sometimes with tan markings; all white is preferred by show breeders); black and white; and tricolor. However, the tan and white may become all white, the blacks will often fade to grey or white, and fur will most likely change throughout puppyhood. The breed even has a fade gene that causes the colors, which are very dark when a puppy, to fade and turn white at the base of the hair as it lengthens; that is why the Champagne or Champagne Teddy Bear Coton eventually turns white when the adult hair comes in.) The Fédération Cynologique Internationale standard specifies that the Coton's coat should be white but may also have tan or "lemon" color on their ears and body. The coat, however, must be primarily white with no black hair. The US-based Coton de Tuléar Club of America allows for three different but equally favorable colorings: white, black-and-white, and tri-color, including "honey bear". White is described as nearly all white, sometimes with tan or champagne coloring on the ears, face, or back. Black-and-white is defined as pure white with prominent black patches on the head and body (no white-to-black ratio is specified or favored). Tri-color is described as mostly white with some brown markings and dustings of black on the body and head. A honey bear tri-color has light brown with black tips that gradually fades to an off-white or lemon color. The tri-color loses the most color of any of the color varieties, usually becoming mostly white with possibly some champagne markings and a dusting of black hairs on the ears and/or body.

Size

The long-limbed Tall Coton shows up in all three color varieties and can be born to a litter with normal-sized parents that carry the appropriate genes.

Detailed description
The nose is black in colour in the Coton de Tuléar Club of America standard. However, the Fédération Cynologique Internationale standard, which also favors a black nose, states that brown is tolerable as well. A pink or partly pink nose is not accepted in either standard. The standard advocates that the lips should preferably be tight and of the same colour as the nose, specifically black in the Coton de Tuléar Club of America standard. A Coton de Tuléar's teeth can be either in a scissor bite or pincer bite. Its eyes are normally round, dark in colour, and wide-set. Traditionally, the expression is lively, intelligent, bright, and merry. Typically, the Coton de Tuléar's ears are triangular and set high. The leather of the ear is often thin, and the neck is strong, favoured to be without a dewlap, and slightly arched.

The chest is typically well developed and reaches to (FCI-Standard N° 283 / 04. 02. 2000 / GB) the elbows. A Coton de Tuléar's feet are small and arched, and its back is normally strong and slightly arched. The pads of the feet are usually black. The body is of moderate length and typically has a moderate tuck-up. Traditionally, the loin is muscular and not overly long. The hind legs are normally strong and straight. The hind feet are similar to the front feet. Throughout history, the dewclaws have been removed; however, many would now oppose this arguably unnecessary and cruel procedure. The tail is traditionally low-set and tapering, carried over the back when in motion or excited, but relaxed otherwise.

Temperament
The Coton is a playful, affectionate, intelligent breed. Although generally quiet, it can become very vocal—grunting, barking, and making other noises when having fun. Cotons are known to have a habit of jumping up and walking on their hind legs to please people. Most Cotons love meeting new people and are very curious about new situations. Cotons are easy to train as they are very eager to please. Cotons love to swim, run, and play. They adapt well to any kind of living environment. A common trait of the Coton de Tuléar behaviour is to come alive in the evening.

Care
The Coton has a coat that requires brushing and combing almost daily and bathing about once per week to maintain its beauty. Cotons love swimming; owners who have pools are recommended to let their Cotons play in the pool with supervision. Like poodles, they do not "shed", meaning they don't drop hair on furniture, carpeting, etc. They do lose hair; their coat's texture causes the shed hair to be trapped in the coat. If not brushed and combed daily, this breed's fur will mat up quickly and may require shaving. Cotons need a walk every day for exercise but will appreciate a play session as often as possible and have the endurance to go on a long hike. Cotons love to play with other dogs, and they are great with kids.

Health

The Coton is, in general, a healthy breed. However, there are still some health issues as there are in all breeds. The most serious issues are heart problems, liver shunts, back (disc) problems, and eye problems. Luckily, these are still relatively uncommon in the breed. The small gene pool of this breed is owing to its near extinction. Due to inbreeding by disreputable breeders, there is an increased incidence of disease. The smaller the gene pool, the more likely a breed is to have genetic abnormalities.

The Coton de Tuléar has few health issues compared to many other breeds due to being rather generic in type. It is a fairly rare breed and is just now being accepted and recognized by the AKC as of 2012. The fact that this is a breed being revived from extinction means that the Coton de Tuléar is rather expensive to purchase, and prices may reach $1,800.00-$3,500 per dog. The average life span of a Coton de Tuléar is 14 to 19 years.

History

The Coton de Tuléar developed on the island of Madagascar and is still the island's national dog. It is believed that the Tenerife dog was brought to Madagascar and mated with a dog on the island, creating an unexpected result. The Coton's ancestors were possibly brought to Madagascar in the 16th and 17th centuries aboard pirate ships. Madagascar was a haven for pirates, and pirate graveyards can still be seen there. Pirates established a base on St. Mary's Island, Madagascar and some of them took Malagasy wives. Whether the dogs were brought along to control rats on the ships, as companions for long voyages, or were confiscated from other ships as booty, no one knows. Tuléar is a port now also known as Toliara. The Coton is of the Bichon dog type, linked most closely to the Bichon Tenerife and the Tenerife Terrier. There have been many stories circulating about the history of the Coton in recent years, most of them untrue. The Coton de Tuléar was never feral on Madagascar. It did not hunt wild boar or crocodiles, as its size, strength, and demeanor can disprove easily. It was a companion dog of the Merina (the ruling tribe) in Madagascar. It has a very little prey drive and is not a hunting dog.

The cottony coat may be the result of a single gene mutation. This small, friendly dog caught the fancy of the Malagasy royalty, and became the only people allowed to keep Cotons. When Dr. Robert Jay Russell discovered the breed in Madagascar in 1973 and brought the first ones to America, he coined the phrase the Royal Dog of Madagascar, and the name stuck. They were also imported occasionally into France by returning French colonists but were not officially imported to Europe until the 1970s.  In 1974, Madagascar released a stamp with the image of the Coton, affirming their status as the nation's "royal dog".
The Coton de Tuléar was first formally recognised as a breed by the Societe Centrale Canine (the French national kennel club) in 1970 and was accepted by the Fédération Cynologique Internationale, which published the breed standard in 1972. The Coton de Tuléar is recognised internationally through the Fédération Cynologique Internationale and by major kennel clubs (The Kennel Club (UK) in the Toy Group, and the United Kennel Club (US) in the Companion Group), using standards-based upon the Fédération Cynologique Internationale standard. The breed is not recognised by the New Zealand Kennel Club or the Australian Kennel Union. It also may be recognised in the English-speaking world by any of the very large numbers of minor registries, clubs, and internet-based dog registry businesses.

In the United States, another standard for the Coton de Tuléar was developed based upon the breed in Madagascar in 1974 by a biologist, Dr. Robert Jay Russell. Russell established the Coton de Tuléar Club of America in 1976 and was opposed to American Kennel Club recognition. The Coton de Tuléar entered the American Kennel Club Foundation Stock Service (their first step in breed recognition) in 1996 and became a fully recognized breed on July 1, 2014. The American Kennel Club Parent Club for the breed in the United States of America Coton de Tuléar Club.

See also
 Dogs portal
 List of dog breeds
 Bichon
 Rare breed (dog)

References

External links

 

FCI breeds
Dog breeds originating in Africa
Companion dogs
Toy dogs
Rare dog breeds
Bichon